Bojihwayangdong buralsongseonsaeng is a bilingual pun in Classical Chinese and Korean that is considered to be part of the literature of the Joseon period of Korea. It has historically been used as a source of humour in Korean.

History
When Heo Mok was ordered to attend the academy of the more senior scholar Song Siyeol at Hwayang-dong, he made the journey and was forced to wait for a long time, only to find the appointment had been cancelled. Heo Mok angrily stated "bojihwayangdong buralsongseonsaeng".

Meaning
Interpreted as a Korean reading of Classical Chinese, the statement means "Walked to Hwayang-dong; did not see teacher Song", but in native Korean, boji refers to "female genitals", while bural means "testicles", making the expression additionally mean "cunt Hwayang-dong; bollocks teacher Song".

See also 
 Song Jun-gil
 Yun Hyu
 Yun Seondo

References

Sources
 정운채, 강미정 외, 문학치료 서사사전 2:설화편(서사와문학치료연구소 문학치료총서 3) (문학과 치료, 2009년)

External links 
 송 정승과 허 정승에 얽힌 화양동 일화:향토문화자원 "Folk Cultural Resources: The Tangled Anecdote of Minister Song and Minister Heo at Hwayang-dong" ( 
 화양구곡과 우암 송시열 "Hwayang Gugok and Song Si-yeol" 

History of Korea
Puns
Joseon dynasty